The 53rd Annual TV Week Logie Awards was held on Sunday 1 May 2011 at the Crown Palladium in Melbourne, and broadcast on the Nine Network. The ceremony was hosted by Shane Bourne, while the red carpet arrivals was hosted by Shelley Craft, Livinia Nixon, James Mathison and Jules Lund. Musical performers at the event were Katy Perry, Maroon 5 and Jessie J. It was the last Logies ceremony to date to have a host.

Winners and nominees
In the tables below, winners are listed first and highlighted in bold.

Gold Logie

Acting/Presenting

Most Popular Programs

Most Outstanding Programs

Performers

Katy Perry – "Firework"
Maroon 5 – "Never Gonna Leave This Bed"
Jessie J – "Price Tag"

Presenters
Catherine McClements
Karl Stefanovic
Peter Stefanovic
Sarah Murdoch
Jamie Durie
Shaun Micallef
Richard Roxburgh
Lisa McCune
Stephen Curry
Deborah Mailman
Shane Jacobson
David Stratton
Margaret Pomeranz
Hamish Blake
Andy Lee
Chris Lilley
Adam Hills
Roy Slaven
H.G. Nelson
André Rieu

In Memoriam
The In Memoriam segment was introduced by host Shane Bourne who spoke of the passing of cinematographer John Bowring ACS. Eddie Perfect and the comedy trio Tripod performed Paul Kelly's "Meet Me in the Middle of the Air" a cappella. The following deceased were honoured:

 Geoff Raymond, news presenter
 Sonia Humphrey, journalist
 Michael Meagher, journalist
 Victoria Longley, actress
 Veronica Overton-Low, entertainer
 Bert Shaw, choreographer
 James Dibble, news presenter
 Eric Walters, news presenter
 Edward Bryans, news presenter
 Dame Pat Evison, actress
 Julie Ryles, entertainer
 Michael Schildberger, journalist
 Adriana Xenides, hostess
 Esben Storm, producer
 Gus Mercurio, actor
 Malcolm Douglas, adventurer
 Murray Nicoll, journalist
 Paulene Terry-Beitz, actress
 Blair Milan, actor
 James Elliott, actor
 Ted Dunn, creator Fredd Bear
 Rex Heading OAM, producer
 Norman Hetherington OAM, puppeteer
 Dame Joan Sutherland OM, opera singer

References

External links
 

2011
2011 television awards
2011 in Australian television
2011 awards in Australia